Bob Roberts (born 21 November 1930) is  a former Australian rules footballer who played with Fitzroy in the Victorian Football League (VFL).

Notes

External links 
		

Living people
1930 births
Australian rules footballers from Victoria (Australia)
Fitzroy Football Club players
Mordialloc Football Club players